Michael J. Harder (born February 8, 1973) is a Canadian former ice hockey coach and center who was an All-American for Colgate.

Career
Harder arrived in Hamilton in the fall of 1993 after finishing out his junior career with the Weyburn Red Wings. He began producing offense immediately for Colgate, tying for the team lead in points as a freshman and being named to the ECAC All-Rookie team. Harder finished in the top ten in the nation the following year, helping Colgate win 20 games and finish 3rd in the conference standings. Harder remained the focal point of the Red Raiders' offense over the next two years, and was named team captain in his senior season. While the team managed to produce winning records in those years, they lost all three of their playoff games. Despite the disappointing finishes, Harder became Colgate's all-time leading scorer and was named an All-American in his final year.

After finishing his college career, Harder turned pro and rounded out the year with a few games of AAA hockey. He had a solid but unspectacular year in 1998 but became a point-per-game player with the Rochester Americans in 1999. He helped the team reach the Calder Cup finals that season and looked to be on track to reach the NHL but his numbers slid afterwards. Harder bounced around between several AHL teams until 2001 when he headed to Europe.

Harder moved around for a time before settling in with the Frankfurt Lions. He helped the club win the DEL championship in 2004, the only title in team's history. A few years later he found his way to Alleghe and spent four years with the team, averaging at least a point per game each season. he returned to North America for one final season before retiring in 2010.

In 2013, Harder returned to Colgate as a volunteer assistant and was brought on full time the following season. He remained with the team until 2019.

Harder was inducted into the Colgate Athletic Hall of Fame in 2008.

Statistics

Regular season and playoffs

Awards and honors

References

External links

1973 births
Living people
AHCA Division I men's ice hockey All-Americans
Canadian ice hockey centres
Ice hockey people from Winnipeg
Colgate Raiders men's ice hockey players
Milwaukee Admirals players
Hamilton Bulldogs (AHL) players
Springfield Falcons players
Rochester Americans players
Hartford Wolf Pack players
Louisville Panthers players
HPK players
Brynäs IF players
HC Merano players
Frankfurt Lions players
Charlotte Checkers (1993–2010) players
ERC Ingolstadt players
Trenton Devils players
VEU Feldkirch players